Kirk Cyron Johnson (born June 29, 1972) is a Canadian former professional boxer who competed from 1993 to 2010, and challenged once for the WBA heavyweight title in 2002.

Amateur career
Johnson represented Canada at the 1992 Olympics in Barcelona, where he lost in the quarter-finals against eventual silver medallist David Izon (Nigeria).

Highlights

 Junior World Championships, Bayamon, Puerto Rico, August 1989:
1/4: Defeated Pencho Dzhurov (Bulgaria) KO 1
1/2: Defeated Bobby Harris (United States) RSCH 1
Finals: Defeated Dmitriy Avdalyan (Soviet Union) on points, 24–11
 Trofeo Italia, Mestre, Venice, Italy, March 1991:
1/4: Defeated Peter Hart (Hungary) RET 1
1/2: Lost to Peter Stettinger (Germany) by unanimous decision, 0–5
World Championships, Sydney, Australia, November 1991:
1/4: Lost to Félix Savón (Cuba) RET 2

 Box-Am Tournament, Badalona, Spain, February 1992:
1/4: Defeated Georgios Stefanopoulos (Greece) on points, 12–7
1/2: Defeated Sandor Deak (Hungary) RET 2
Finals: Lost to Félix Savón (Cuba) on points, 5–14
North & Central American Olympic Qualifications, Santo Domingo, Dominican Republic, April 1992:
1/2: Defeated Aridio Fana (Dominican Republic) on points, 18–2
Finals: Defeated Jose Aníbal Marrero (Puerto Rico) on points, 28–4
Summer Olympics, Barcelona, Spain, July–August 1992:
1/8: Defeated Joseph Akhasamba (Kenya) RSC 2
1/4: Lost to David Izonritei (Nigeria) on points, 5–9

His amateur record was 76 wins and 7 losses.

Professional career
Johnson had his first professional bout on April 24, 1993, against Andre Smiley.

In his first title fight in 2002 Johnson faced John Ruiz for the WBA Heavyweight Title. In the tenth round Johnson was disqualified for low blows while losing on all of the judges' scorecards. Johnson appealed the disqualification to the WBA, on the grounds that referee Joe Cortez had erred in calling some of the low blows and did not act impartially (both Ruiz and Cortez are of Puerto Rican descent). Though many boxing commentators agreed that the disqualification was unwarranted, the appeal was ultimately denied by the WBA.

On December 6, 2003, Johnson faced the Ukrainian contender and future champion Vitali Klitschko in New York's Madison Square Garden. He was easily defeated by Klitschko, losing by a second-round knockout.

Johnson compounded the Klitschko embarrassment by coming into this fight at 260 pounds — an all-time high for him. Johnson weighed 232 pounds in his biggest win, over future WBC Heavyweight Champion Oleg Maskaev, in 2000.

Comeback
After the Klitschko fight, Johnson staged a comeback.  He knocked out Mexican heavyweight Gilbert Martinez in July 2004 and won a technical decision over Cuban Yanqui Díaz in June 2005, although he lost his next bout (later changed to a technical decision) against Californian Javier Mora in March 2006. Mora appeared to have accidentally stepped on Johnson's foot, causing Johnson to dislocate his knee. This decision was subsequently appealed and the result changed to a No Decision. Johnson has since recovered from his knee injury.

On April 29, 2010, Johnson returned to the ring after a four-year absence and fought journeyman Douglas Robertson defeating him via first-round TKO.

Johnson's record is now at 37–2–1 (27 KOs), with one No Decision.

Halifax Regional Police lawsuit
In 2003, after dropping out of a planned fight against then-heavyweight champion Lennox Lewis because of an injury, Johnson launched a protracted legal battle against the Halifax Regional Police. During the inquiry, Johnson claimed that because of racism and racial profiling by the Halifax Regional Police he had his car stopped 28 times over five years while in Halifax. Johnson was awarded $10,000 in damages, in addition to $4,790 to cover his travel expenses. The police service was also ordered to create a scholarship in Johnson's name. It is awarded annually to a student from North Preston. Since 2003, 16 students have received awards.

Professional boxing record

References

External links
 
 
 
 

1972 births
Black Nova Scotians
Boxers at the 1992 Summer Olympics
Black Canadian boxers
Living people
Olympic boxers of Canada
People from the Halifax Regional Municipality
Sportspeople from Nova Scotia
Canadian male boxers
Heavyweight boxers